Same-sex marriage in Cuba has been legal since 27 September 2022, after a majority of voters approved the legalization of same-sex marriage at a referendum two days prior. The Constitution of Cuba prohibited same-sex marriage until 2019, and in May 2019 the government announced plans to legalize same-sex marriage. A draft family code containing provisions allowing same-sex couples to marry and adopt was approved by the National Assembly of People's Power on 21 December 2021. The text was under public consultation until 6 June 2022, and was approved by the Assembly on 22 July 2022. The measure was approved by two-thirds of voters in a referendum held on 25 September 2022. President Miguel Díaz-Canel signed the new family code into law on 26 September, and it took effect upon publication in the Official Gazette the following day.

Cuba was the first independent nation in the Caribbean, the eighth country in Latin America, the first communist state, the first of the former Eastern Bloc (excluding East Germany and Slovenia) and the 32nd country worldwide to legalize same-sex marriage.

Civil unions
A civil union law was first proposed in 2007. The bill was reportedly discussed by the National Assembly of People's Power and promoted by Mariela Castro, director of the Cuban Sexual Education Center and daughter of the First Secretary of the Communist Party, Raúl Castro. The legislation did not reach a vote in Parliament, even though Mariela Castro said that it had the support of her father.

The 2022 Cuban Family Code put to a referendum on 25 September 2022 includes provisions allowing couples access to civil unions.

Same-sex marriage

Attempts to change the Constitution
Article 36 of the Constitution of Cuba, enacted in 1976, defined marriage as "the voluntarily established union between a man and a woman" until 2019. This wording constitutionally banned same-sex marriage. In December 2017, LGBT groups launched a public campaign to repeal the ban. On 4 May 2018, Mariela Castro said she would propose an amendment to the Constitution and accompanying measure to legalize same-sex marriage, as the process of constitutional reform was expected to begin in July 2018. On 21 July, the Secretary of the Council of State, Homero Acosta Álvarez, said that the draft constitution included a provision defining marriage as a "union between two people". The National Assembly approved the draft on 22 July. It was subject to public consultation between 13 August and 15 November 2018.

The issue of same-sex marriage resulted in rare public debates and organising in Cuba. In June 2018, five Christian denominations declared same-sex marriage "contrary to the spirit of Communist Revolution". In what was described as "a war of posters", both opponents and supporters of same-sex marriage displayed hundreds of posters around Havana. In September 2018, following conservative opposition to the proposal to legalise same-sex marriage, President Miguel Díaz-Canel announced his support for same-sex marriage in his first interview since taking office in April, telling TV Telesur that he supports "marriage between people without any restrictions", and is in favor of "eliminating any type of discrimination in society".

On 18 December, the constitutional commission removed the definition of marriage from the draft. Instead, the commission chose to use gender-neutral language and define marriage as a "social and legal institution" without reference to the gender of the parties. This meant that the new constitution would not legalize same-sex marriage, but at the same time the ban on same-sex marriage would be repealed. Mariela Castro said that same-sex marriage would instead be legalised through a change to the Family Code. Writing in the Havana Times, commentator and human rights activist Luis Rondón Paz argued that the government never intended to legalize same-sex marriage, and was instead seeking to deflect attention from other domestic issues and promote itself internationally as a progressive state.

The new constitution was approved in a referendum by 90.6% on 24 February 2019, and took effect on 10 April 2019. Article 82 reads as follows:

Changes to the Family Code

Before the legalization of same-sex marriage in September 2022, article 2 of the Cuban Family Code restricted marriage to "a man and a woman". It also did not recognize same-sex marriages performed outside of Cuba.

In early March 2019, shortly after the constitutional referendum, the government launched a public consultation process on a new family code that would include provisions recognizing same-sex marriage. In May 2019, it was announced that the Union of Jurists of Cuba was working on the new code, with a source stating that "Cuba is working today on the elaboration of a new Code of the Family, with the challenge of including the diversity of family institutions and problems of the social scenario". A draft family code legalizing same-sex marriage was presented in September 2021. It was approved unanimously by the National Assembly on 21 December 2021, and published in the Official Gazette on 13 January 2022. The text was under public consultation from 15 February to 6 June 2022. 79,000 meetings were held across Cuba in which about 6.5 million citizens participated, according to official data. The government reported that 61% of the responses to the consultation were in favor of same-sex marriage. During the consultation process, some LGBT activists criticized holding a referendum on the issue of same-sex marriage, arguing that minority rights should not be put to a public vote. The government said that it did not want to impose same-sex marriage by force against the public's will.

Article 201 of the code describes marriage as a "consensual union of two people", and chapter 3 of the code allows same-sex couples to adopt. The code also ensures greater protection for children and adolescents, the co-responsibility of parents in their education, and strict equality of rights between men and women. It also guarantees the right of minors not to be the object of exclusion, violence or parental neglect, and establishes a uniform marriageable age at 18 for men and women. Final approval by the Assembly occurred on 22 July 2022, with the code put to a referendum on 25 September 2022. Approximately 67% of voters approved the changes to the code, making Cuba the first communist state to legalize same-sex marriages and the 32nd worldwide. President Díaz-Canel signed the new code into law on 26 September, and it took effect the following day when it was published in the Official Gazette. The first same-sex marriage in Cuba was performed on 5 October 2022 in Manzanillo.

Religious performance
A pastor from the Metropolitan Community Church in Matanzas officiated at the marriage ceremony of Luis Alberto Vallejo Rodríguez and Luis Miguel Fernández Neves on 6 October 2019, in what is believed to be the first church wedding for a same-sex couple in Cuba, though the marriage lacked legal recognition at the time.

Public opinion
A 2019 Apretaste opinion survey showed that 63.1% of Cubans were in favor of legalising same-sex marriage, while 36.9% were opposed.

See also
 LGBT rights in Cuba
 Recognition of same-sex unions in the Americas

Notes

References

External links
Family Code of Cuba (in Spanish)

LGBT rights in Cuba
Cuba
2022 in LGBT history